Cornelis sjunger Victor Jara: rätten till ett eget liv (English: Cornelis sings Victor Jara: The right to one's own life) is an album recorded by the Swedish-Dutch folk singer-songwriter Cornelis Vreeswijk in 1978.

History
Vreeswijk worked and travelled to Latin America in the late 1960s and early 1970s and developed a great appreciation for its rich musical heritage. He translated ten songs of Chilean troubadour Victor Jara and recorded both a Swedish and a Dutch album with translated songs.

Track listing
"Plogen" (El arado) The plough (Victor Jara - Adapt: Cornelis Vreeswijk) 3:35
"Jag minns dig Amanda" (Te recuerdo Amanda) I remember you Amanda (Victor Jara - Adapt: Cornelis Vreeswijk) - 2:25
"A Cuba" To Cuba (Victor Jara - Adapt: Cornelis Vreeswijk) - 4:20
"Manifest" (Manifesto) (Victor Jara - Adapt: Cornelis Vreeswijk) - 4:00
"Rätten till ett eget liv" (El derecho de vivir en paz) The right to live in peace (Victor Jara - Adapt: Cornelis Vreeswijk) - 4:05
"La Diuca" (Victor Jara - Adapt: Cornelis Vreeswijk) - 2:58
"Varken det ena eller andra" (Ni chicha, ni limona) Nor fish, nor fowl (Victor Jara - Adapt: Cornelis Vreeswijk)  - 3:23
"Angelita Hueneman" (Victor Jara - Adapt: Cornelis Vreeswijk) - 4:08
"Fimpen" (El cigarrito) The cigarette butt (Victor Jara - Adapt: Cornelis Vreeswijk) - 2:16
"Folkets vind" (Vientos del pueblo) Winds of the people (Victor Jara -  Miguel Hernandez - Adapt: Cornelis Vreeswijk) - 2:35
"La Partida - Instrumental" The departure (Victor Jara - Adapt: Cornelis Vreeswijk) - 3:15

Personnel
Cornelis Vreeswijk - vocal
Björn J:son Lindh - flute, piano, electric piano, keyboards
Janne Schaffer - guitar

Other musicians
Lasse Englund - guitar
Mats Glenngård - violin, viola
Sture Nordin - bass
Stefan Brolund - bass ("Plogen")
Okay Temiz - percussion
Hassan Bah - congas (''"A Cuba")

External links
Review article on Cornelis sjunger Victor Jara album background in Friheten
Swedish Cornelis Vreeswijk Society (Cornelis Vreeswijksällskapet)
Dutch Cornelis Vreeswijk homepage

References

Cornelis Vreeswijk albums
1978 albums